This is a timeline of the history of cricket on television in the UK.

1930s to 1950s 

 1938
 On 24th June, the BBC broadcasts cricket - England vs Australia at Lord’s - on television for the first time.

 1956
 On 28 April, ITV - at that point only available in the London area and in the Midlands - shows cricket for the first time, when it exclusively shows the Australian touring team's match against the Duke of Norfolk's XI at Arundel Castle.

1960s
 1960
 No events.

 1961
 No events.

 1962
 No events.

 1963
7 September – The BBC shows live coverage of the final of the first Gillette Cup final. 

 1964
 No events.

 1965
 2 May – Sunday Cricket is broadcast for the first time. The programme, which runs throughout the afternoon on BBC2, features full coverage of a match "played under knock-out rules".

 1966
 No events.

 1967
 No events.

 1968
 29 and 30 July - ITV shows test cricket for the only time, and only part-networked, when the last two days of the Headingley Test against Australia coincide with the launch of Yorkshire Television.  The morning session is the first thing shown on Thames Television, before its official opening.
 7 September - The new ITV company London Weekend Television wins the rights to show the Gillette Cup final between Warwickshire and Sussex.  This coverage is only partially networked, with other regions cutting off their coverage earlier, but coverage of the finish - shown principally in the London and Southern areas - is faded out with six minutes to go to make way for advertising and then David Frost's programme.  Subsequently, there is only very occasional networked or even part-networked cricket coverage on ITV, although regional coverage continues on occasions into the 1990s.

 1969
 27 April – Sunday Cricket begins broadcasting a match each week from the new Sunday League.

1970s
 1970
No events.

 1971
 No events.

 1972
 A new one-day competition, the Benson & Hedges Cup, begins and the BBC provides live coverage of a match from each round.

 1973
 No events.

 1974
 No events.

 1975
 7–21 June – The BBC shows extensive live coverage of the first Cricket World Cup.

 1976
 No events.

 1977
 No events.

 1978
 No events.

 1979
 9–23 June – The BBC shows extensive live coverage of the 1979 Cricket World Cup.

1980s 

 1980
 No events.

 1981
 17 May – Sunday Grandstand launches. The programme includes weekly coverage of the Sunday League which had been shown every Sunday afternoon during the cricket season on BBC2 since 1965.

 1982
 No events.

 1983
 9–25 June – The BBC shows extensive live coverage of the 1983 Cricket World Cup.

 1984
 No events.

 1985
 No events.

 1986
 November–January 1987 – The BBC shows occasional live coverage of the English cricket team in Australia in 1986–87 although the vast majority of its coverage is in highlights form. The live coverage consists of occasional sessions from the Ashes matches and of England's appearance in the final of the Benson & Hedges Challenge on 7 January 1987.

 1987
 16 July - Channel 4 show the first day-long coverage of women's cricket in the UK when England play Australia at Lord's.  Coverage begins at 10.45 am and finishes at 6.30 pm, with breaks for the lunch and tea intervals.  However, only the late-night highlights are shown in Wales, where S4C show Glamorgan against Pakistan instead.
 9 October–8 November – The BBC covers the 1987 Cricket World Cup. However due to the time difference – the tournament is held in India and Pakistan – live coverage is restricted to England’s matches and then only the final overs of each game are shown live. The only exception is the final itself which is broadcast live and in full.

 1988
 February–March – ITV shows highlights of England’s tour to New Zealand, the first coverage of the England team on ITV for two decades.  Yorkshire Television and TVS initially buy the rights; coverage is also taken by London ITV and in the Channel Islands.

 1989
 No events.

1990s 
 1990
 January–March – Sky shows live coverage of England's cricketing tour to the West Indies. This is the first time that live coverage of an overseas tour has been shown in the UK. The coverage is broadcast on Sky One.

 1991
 No events.

 1992
 22 February-25 March – Sky shows its first major cricket tournament when it broadcasts exclusive live coverage of the 1992 Cricket World Cup. This is the beginning of Sky's coverage of the event which continues to this day and is therefore Sky Sports' longest-held set of rights. The event receives no terrestrial coverage apart from the final, when the BBC shows highlights due to England reaching the final.

 1993
 1 August - The BBC makes a last minute decision to feature live coverage of the Women's World Cup final on Grandstand. The broadcast is watched by 2.5 million viewers.

 1994
 The BBC show England's home one-day internationals live for the last time.

 1995
 Sky Sports take over the live rights for England's home one-day internationals, although highlights continue to be shown on the BBC.
 15 May – The BBC launches a monthly cricket magazine called Gower's Cricket Monthly.
 3 September - Cricket is shown live on a regional basis on ITV for the last time, when Yorkshire's match against the West Indies at Scarborough is shown by Yorkshire Television.

 1996
 14 February-17 March – Once again, Sky Sports is the exclusive broadcaster of the Cricket World Cup with highlights shown on the BBC. The event was originally to be shown on a new cable sports channel but when the venture collapsed, Sky picked up the rights. 
 June – Sky Sports broadcasts women's cricket for the first time.

 1997
 No events.

 1998
 22 September – The final edition of cricket magazine Gower's Cricket Monthly is broadcast; a month later it is announced that the BBC has lost the right to show English cricket to Channel 4

 1999
 20 June – The BBC broadcasts live cricket for the final time for more than 20 years when it shows live coverage of the 1999 Cricket World Cup Final, bringing to an end half a century of continuous cricket coverage on the BBC. The BBC had shared live coverage of the event with Sky Sports.
 1 July – Channel 4 starts broadcasting cricket following the channel sensationally obtaining the rights from the BBC the previous year.
 Sky Sports broadcasts a home Test Match live for the first time as part of a joint deal with Channel 4. This arrangement continues until 2005.

2000s 
 2000
 No events.

 2001
 No events.

 2002
 No events.

 2003
 No events.

 2004
 No events.

2005
 September – Cricket is shown on Channel 4 for the final time until 2019.

 2006
 May – 
Sky Sports becomes the exclusive broadcaster of all live cricket matches in the UK following the ECB awarding Sky exclusive coverage of all of England's home tests, one-day internationals and Twenty20 Internationals.
Channel 5 becomes the new terrestrial home of highlights of England cricket's home matches.
The first edition of Cricket AM is broadcast on Sky Sports and Sky One. Based on its successful football-related counterpart Soccer AM, it broadcasts during the football off-season.

 2007
 13 March-28 April – The BBC broadcast highlights of the 2007 ICC Cricket World Cup. This is the first time since 1999 that cricket has been shown on BBC Television. Once again, Sky Sports holds the exclusive rights to live coverage. The BBC also shows highlights of the 2011 event.

 2008
 18 May – Setanta Sports shows full live coverage of the first Indian Premier League.

 2009
 No events.

2010s
2010
 February – ITV shows live cricket throughout the UK for the first time in the modern era when it begins showing coverage of the Indian Premier League. ITV then decides to take out a four-year deal for the event. ITV further expands its coverage of cricket when it shows highlights of the 2010/11 Ashes series 
 22–31 July – ESPN shows the inaugural Caribbean Twenty20 tournament.

2011
 No events.

2012
 11–31 August – ESPN shows live coverage of the first Sri Lanka Premier League.

2013
 30 June – Sky Sports launches its first temporary channel Sky Sports Ashes to provide full coverage of the 2013 Ashes Series. Temporary channel renames of this nature is now common practice within Sky, both for sports and movies. Sky Sports Ashes subsequently returns for the 2015 Ashes series and also for the 2019 Ashes series
 August – Cricket AM is broadcast for the final time.

2014
 1 June – ITV's live coverage of the Indian Premier League ends, having shown the event since 2010.

2015
 February – Sky Sports takes over as broadcaster of cricket's Indian Premier League after five years with ITV.
 14 February-29 March – ITV shows highlights of the 2015 Cricket World Cup. This is the first and so far only time that ITV has covered the event. Live coverage is shown on Sky Sports, and rebrands Sky Sports 2 as Sky Sports World Cup for the duration of the tournament.

2016
 July – UKTV channel Dave shows the Caribbean Premier League. It broadcasts five matches live, including the final, and shows the other games in full on a delayed basis.
 24 August – BT Sport takes over from Sky Sports as broadcaster of Australia's home matches for five years. This means that BT will show The Ashes series between England and Australia in 2017–18 with the deal also including the Big Bash League, the Women's Ashes and the Women's Big Bash League.

2017
 18 July – Sky Sports is revamped with the numbered channels being replaced by sports-specific channels. One of the new channels is devoted to cricket and is called Sky Sports Cricket. 
10 August-1 September – Sky Sports broadcasts eight matches live from the 2017 Women's Cricket Super League. This marks Sky’s first major foray into women’s cricket. Sky expands its coverage the following year, showing 12 matches from the 2018 event.

2018
 March–May – BT Sport broadcasts the 2018 Indian Premier League. It is a one-off as the following year the event transfers back to Sky Sports.
 8 August – Sky Sports takes over from BT Sport as broadcaster of cricket's Caribbean Premier League.

2019
 31 May - 14 July – Sky Sports Cricket is rebranded as Sky Sports Cricket World Cup to show live and recorded coverage of the 2019 Cricket World Cup in England and Wales.
 14 July – Channel 4 shows live coverage of the 2019 Cricket World Cup Final. This is the first time since 2005 that live cricket has been shown on one of the former analogue channels. Channel 4 had the rights to show highlights of the tournament. Sky Sports had the live rights to the tournament but had agreed to make the final available on free-to-air television if England made the final.
 15 September – After 14 seasons, Channel 5 shows cricket highlights for the final time.

2020s
 2020
 July – Regular coverage of cricket returns to the BBC when it succeeds Channel 5 as the broadcaster of highlights of English cricket.
 20 August – The BBC shows live cricket for the first time in more than 21 years.
 26 September - The BBC shows live coverage of a women's international match for the first time since the 1993 World Cup final.

 2021
 5 February – 
 The first live coverage of a test match on terrestrial television for more than 15 years is broadcast on Channel 4 when the channel begins showing England’s test series against India. However Channel 4's coverage does not include the one-day and T20 international matches as these are shown  on Sky Sports.
 BT Sport secures the rights to all international and domestic cricket played in the West Indies and New Zealand for the next two years. This includes England's tour to the West Indies in 2022. Sky Sports had been the previous holder of these rights.
 2 March – FreeSports shows test cricket for the first time when it starts showing all tests, ODIs and T20 fixtures involving Afghanistan and Zimbabwe. This builds on the channel's cricket coverage which consisted of T10 and T20 events.
21 July - 23 August – The inaugural 2021 season of The Hundred takes place. Games are shown live on Sky Sports, which rebrands Sky Sports Cricket to Sky Sports The Hundred for the duration of the tournament, and on the BBC.

 2022
 13 November – Channel 4 shows live coverage of the final of the 2022 ICC Men's T20 World Cup in which England plays Pakistan. The rest of the tournament had been shown by Sky Sports.

 2023
 10 January – Sky Sports begins showing South Africa’s new T20 cricket league.

See also
 Timeline of BBC Sport
 Timeline of ITV Sport
 Timeline of sport on Channel 4
 Timeline of sport on Channel 5
 Timeline of Sky Sports
 Timeline of BT Sport
 Timeline of other British sports channels

References

cricket on UK television
cricket on UK television
cricket on UK television
Sports television in the United Kingdom
cricket on UK television
Cricket in England